The Canada–Jordan Free Trade Agreement (CJFTA) is a free trade agreement between Canada and Jordan.  The bilateral agreement has been in force since October 2012.

References

Jordan
Free trade agreements of Jordan
Treaties entered into force in 2012
Foreign relations of Canada
Foreign relations of Jordan